Mesalina is a genus of wall lizards of the family Lacertidae.

Species
The following 20 described species are recognized as being valid.

Mesalina adramitana  – Hadramaut sand lizard
Mesalina adrarensis 
Mesalina arnoldi  
Mesalina austroarabica  
Mesalina ayunensis  – Ayun sand lizard, Arnold's sand lizard
Mesalina bahaeldini  
Mesalina balfouri  
Mesalina bernoullii  – Bernoulli's short-nosed desert lizard 
Mesalina brevirostris  – Blanford's short-nosed desert lizard
Mesalina ercolinii  
Mesalina guttulata  – small-spotted lizard
Mesalina kuri  
Mesalina martini  – Martin's desert racer
Mesalina microlepis  – small-scaled desert lizard
Mesalina olivieri  – Olivier's sand lizard
Mesalina pasteuri  – Pasteur's lizard
Mesalina rubropunctata  – red-spotted lizard
Mesalina saudiarabica 
Mesalina simoni  – Simon's desert racer
Mesalina watsonana  – Persian long-tailed desert lizard

Nota bene: A binomial authority in parentheses indicates that the species was originally described in a genus other than Mesalina.

References

Further reading
Gray JE (1838). "Catalogue of the Slender-tongued Saurians, with Descriptions of many new Genera and Species". Ann. Mag. Nat. Hist., [First Series ] 1: 274–283, 388–394. (Mesalina, new genus, p. 282).

 
Lizard genera
Taxa named by John Edward Gray